Stephen Philip Grapes (born 25 February 1953) is an English former professional footballer.

Grapes, a right-sided midfielder, began his career with his local team Norwich City, for whom he made 52 appearances and scored 4 goals. He made his league debut for the club during its promotion season of 1971–72. After he had a loan spell with AFC Bournemouth in 1975, he left Norwich permanently in 1976 to sign for Cardiff City for a fee of £7,000. Grapes spent six years at Ninian Park as the club struggled in the lower divisions and was released in 1982 following their relegation to division three. He joined Torquay United and later played for Bath City.

References
 

1953 births
English footballers
Footballers from Norwich
Norwich City F.C. players
AFC Bournemouth players
Cardiff City F.C. players
Torquay United F.C. players
Bath City F.C. players
English Football League players
Living people
Association football midfielders